Shepard (Francis Leighton) is a fictional mutant villain appearing in American comic books published by Marvel Comics. His first appearance was in Mystique #6.

Fictional character biography
Shepard first approached Mystique in Cuba and tried to convince her to turn against Charles Xavier, that he and his employer could give her protection. Shepard gave her a necklace to contact him with and vanished. He continuously appeared and reappeared, always knowing where she was, stirring up trouble for Xavier's newest agent. It was later revealed he was helping Shortpack to track down the murderer of Prudence Leighton, an arms dealer called Steinbeck and had insight into all Mystique's missions to some degree.

Shepard reported back to The Quiet Man (whom he referred to as "beloved") and tried to manipulate Mystique at every turn, finally succeeding at one point. Shepard believed he had totally duped Mystique and even bore witness to her murdering Fantomex and E.V.A on a beach apparently to protect their secret.

Shepard eventually saw Mystique as no longer useful when her cloaking device was turned off so he held Shortpack hostage having lured the little mutant to the Quiet Man's lair. Mystique failed but somehow fled Genosha at supersonic speed. When Shepard tracked her down to New York he pulled a gun on her to finish the job, believing she was disguised as Fantomex.

Actually Mystique had duped Shepard, and had communicated a plan to Fantomex on a sub-aural level that he could hear but others could not - by morphing her vocal cords. She and Fantomex grabbed Shepard and Fantomex revealed that Shepard was in fact Prudence's brother, who had joined hIS sister, who now inhabited the body of Steinbeck and had taken on the Quiet Man identity. Mystique chopped off Shepard's hand to get at his teleporter watch and went to deal with The Quiet Man.

The revelation of Prudence being the Quiet Man and being referred by Shepard as beloved hints a past incestuous relationship between the two.

Powers and abilities
Projects "black bile" as a concussive effect from his eyes. It is possible that he also had hyper-regeneration powers, as his hand was chopped but he later appeared with said hand, though it remains possible it was a simple mistake from the artists.

References

Characters created by Brian K. Vaughan
Fictional secret agents and spies in comics
Marvel Comics mutants
Marvel Comics supervillains